Hannah Fry   (born February 1984) is a British mathematician, author, and radio and television presenter. She is Professor in the Mathematics of Cities at the UCL Centre for Advanced Spatial Analysis. She studies the patterns of human behaviour, such as interpersonal relationships and dating, and how mathematics can apply to them. Fry delivered the 2019 Royal Institution Christmas Lectures.

Early life and education
Fry is of mixed English and Irish heritage; her father is English, and her mother is from Ireland. One summer, her mother made her solve all the problems in a mathematics textbook, and this put her ahead of the other students in the next school year. She attended Presdales School in Ware, Hertfordshire, England, where a teacher inspired her to study mathematics. She subsequently graduated from University College London (UCL). In 2011, she submitted a thesis based on the Navier–Stokes equations, and was awarded a PhD from the department of Mathematics by UCL.

Career

Academia 
Fry was appointed as a lecturer at University College London in 2012. At the UCL Centre for Advanced Spatial Analysis, following a number of years as a senior lecturer and then associate professor, she was appointed professor in the Mathematics of Cities, in 2021.

TED and YouTube 
For a year, Fry decided to say "yes" to everything, which led to her trying stand-up comedy, a TED Talk (invited by the German neuroscientist Alina Strasser), and television work.

On 30 March 2014, Fry gave a TED talk at TEDxBinghamtonUniversity titled The Mathematics of Love, which  has attracted over 5.2 million views. Her book The Mathematics of Love: Patterns, Proofs, and the Search for the Ultimate Equation – in which she applies statistical and data-scientific models to dating, sex and marriage – was published by Simon and Schuster under the TED Books imprint in February 2015.

Fry has appeared in several videos for a YouTube mathematics channel, Numberphile, run by Brady Haran. She has also made an appearance on his podcast: The Numberphile Podcast.

Radio and television 
Fry regularly appears on BBC Radio 4 in the UK, including in Computing Britain (2015, 12 episodes) and The Curious Cases of Rutherford & Fry (with Adam Rutherford), which aired its 17th series in 2020/21.

Fry has presented several BBC television programmes. In 2015, she presented a BBC Four film biography of Ada Lovelace. In 2016, she co-presented Trainspotting Live with Peter Snow, a three-part series about trains and trainspotting, for the same channel. In the BBC Two series City in the Sky Fry studied the logistics of aviation. She also hosted The Joy of Data on BBC Four, which examines the history and human impact of data. A further credit for 2016 was her co-hosting an episode of the BBC Two Horizon series with Dr Xand van Tulleken, titled How to Find Love Online. In 2017, Fry presented an episode of Horizon titled 10 Things You Need to Know About the Future.

In 2018, Fry presented Contagion! The BBC Four Pandemic, about the possible impact of a flu pandemic, in which she said " ... we are about to simulate the outbreak of a fatal contagion throughout the UK. ... if I can succeed this will save lives when, not if, a real pandemic hits". The programme used Haslemere, Surrey as the site of the first simulated infection, and coincidentally in February 2020 the town saw the first recorded case of a person contracting COVID-19 from within the UK. In the same year she presented Magic Numbers, also on BBC Four, a three-part series which explored mathematical concepts. She hosted a one-off 90-minute special of the BBC science programme Tomorrow's World alongside four presenters from the show's original run: Maggie Philbin, Howard Stableford, Judith Hann and Peter Snow.

In 2019, Fry presented a BBC Four programme titled A Day in the Life of Earth which explored how Earth changes in a single day and how these daily changes are essential to human existence. Fry also co-presented a Horizon episode titled The Honest Supermarket, which covered a range of issues, including expiry dates and their impact on food waste, microplastics in the human food supply and the impact food consumption has on the environment. She presented the 2019 edition of the Royal Institution Christmas Lectures, entitled Secrets and lies, on the hidden numbers, rules and patterns that control daily lives; the three lectures were broadcast on BBC Four.

In 2020, Fry co-presented both The Great British Intelligence Test and Coronavirus Special – Part 2 with Michael Mosley on BBC Two. She has presented further programmes for the BBC explaining the mathematics behind COVID-19 and other pandemics.

In 2021, Fry was the guest interviewee on The Life Scientific on BBC Radio 4.

In 2022, Fry was twice a panellist on Have I Got News For You, with the episodes first airing on 15 April 2022 and 28 October 2022 on BBC One.

In July 2022, she presented the BBC Two documentary Unvaccinated, in which she investigated why a portion of the British population remained unvaccinated against COVID-19.

Beginning 10 November 2022, Fry presented a six-part series on BBC Two: in The Secret Genius Of Modern Life she investigates topics such as how credit cards came into being, their manufacture and how they work, and how we use apps to order takeaway deliveries.

She will present The Future With Hannah Fry on Bloomberg Originals in March 2023.

Writing
Fry has written three books. The first, The Mathematics of Love: Patterns, Proofs, and the Search for the Ultimate Equation (2015), includes the "37% rule", a form of the secretary problem according to which roughly the first third of any potential partners should be rejected. The second, The Indisputable Existence of Santa Claus (2016, co-authored with fellow mathematician Thomas Oléron Evans), discusses various Christmas-related topics and how mathematics can be involved in them, including a fair Secret Santa, decoration of Christmas trees, winning at Monopoly, and comparing the vocabulary of the Queen's Christmas message to that of the lyrics of Snoop Dogg. Her third book is Hello World: Being Human in the Age of Algorithms (2018) (retitled, and reprinted, in the same year, as Hello World: How to be Human in the Age of the Machine), which looks at the impact of algorithms that affect lives.

Fry has attempted to overturn the stereotype that mathematics is "boring" and not worth studying. Although she acknowledges the subject is difficult, she believes it is possible to frame it using stories that people can relate to, such as the material in her books.

Publications
 The Mathematics of Love (2015), 
 The Indisputable Existence of Santa Claus (2017), 
 Hello World: How to be Human in the Age of the Machine (2019),

Awards and honours
In 2013, Fry won the UCL Provost's Public Engager of the Year award. The award recognises the work that UCL's staff and students are doing to open up the university. Fry was nominated for her broad portfolio of public engagement activities.

In 2018, the Institute of Mathematics and its Applications and the London Mathematical Society announced that Fry had won that year's Christopher Zeeman Medal "for her contributions to the public understanding of the mathematical sciences".

In 2020, Fry won the Asimov Prize, a literary-scientific award organised by the Italian graduate school Gran Sasso Science Institute, for her book Hello World. In 2020, Fry was also awarded the Honorary Fellowship of the Institution of Engineering and Technology (IET) on the 150th anniversary of the institution.

Personal life
After meeting on a blind date in 2014, Fry married Phil, a sports writer and stay-at-home dad; they have two daughters.

In January 2021 she was diagnosed with cervical cancer, and the following month underwent radical hysterectomy. She was commissioned by BBC Two to write and present a Horizon documentary about her treatment and its long-term effects (in her case including lymphoedema), in which she explores the statistics behind screening and decision-making by patients and doctors. The 60-minute programme Making Sense of Cancer with Hannah Fry was first shown on 2 June 2022.

References

External links

 
 
 
 Modelling The Coronavirus: interview with Hannah Fry – Click, BBC 
 Numberphile. 
 
 Hannah Fry.  for DeepMind Technologies, Google

Living people
21st-century women mathematicians
21st-century women scientists
Academics of University College London
Alumni of University College London
BBC Radio 4 presenters
British mathematicians
British people of Irish descent
Date of birth missing (living people)
Fellows of the Institute of Engineering and Technology
Fellows of the Royal Academy of Engineering
Female Fellows of the Royal Academy of Engineering
Mathematics education in the United Kingdom
Mathematics educators
Mathematics popularizers
The New Yorker people
People from Harlow
Place of birth missing (living people)
Science communicators
1984 births